Jarkko ja Laura are a Finnish pop-duo. They first had their break on the Finnish music scene in 1966, with a mildly successful song written by Laura, "Meidän laulumme". From then on, they released many singles, along with a few covers of English songs such as "The Windmills of Your Mind", "Cinderella Rockefella", "Lament of the Cherokee Reservation", which were popular at the time. 

They were chosen to represent Finland in the Eurovision Song Contest 1969 in Spain with the song Kuin silloin ennen (Like in Those Times). They beat out now popular Finnish singer, Katri Helena, in the national final by just a few thousand postcard votes. In Madrid, they placed 12th in the voting results. Shortly after the contest, they got married.

After their participation in the Eurovision Song Contest, they released singles continually until 1972. More currently, Jarkko is a photographer and Laura is still performing music. She released an album in 2004, called "Tyttö kaupungista" (Translates roughly in English as: "City girl").

External links 
 Official Website (In Finnish)
 Jarkko's Photographic Work (in Finnish)

20th-century Finnish singers
Eurovision Song Contest entrants for Finland
Eurovision Song Contest entrants of 1969
Finnish schlager groups